The men's road race at the 1958 British Empire and Commonwealth Games, was part of the cycling programme, which took place in July 1958.

Results

References

Men's road race
Road cycling at the Commonwealth Games
1958 in road cycling